Novotroitsky (masculine), Novotroitskaya (feminine), or Novotroitskoye (neuter) is the name of several rural localities in Russia.

Amur Oblast
As of 2010, two rural localities in Amur Oblast bear this name:
Novotroitskoye, Blagoveshchensky District, Amur Oblast, a selo in Novotroitsky Rural Settlement of Blagoveshchensky District
Novotroitskoye, Konstantinovsky District, Amur Oblast, a selo in Novotroitsky Rural Settlement of Konstantinovsky District

Republic of Bashkortostan
As of 2010, seven rural localities in the Republic of Bashkortostan bear this name:
Novotroitskoye, Aurgazinsky District, Republic of Bashkortostan, a village in Tryapinsky Selsoviet of Aurgazinsky District
Novotroitskoye, Bakalinsky District, Republic of Bashkortostan, a village in Starosharashlinsky Selsoviet of Bakalinsky District
Novotroitskoye, Chishminsky District, Republic of Bashkortostan, a selo in Novotroitsky Selsoviet of Chishminsky District
Novotroitskoye, Fyodorovsky District, Republic of Bashkortostan, a village in Dedovsky Selsoviet of Fyodorovsky District
Novotroitskoye, Iglinsky District, Republic of Bashkortostan, a village in Tavtimanovsky Selsoviet of Iglinsky District
Novotroitskoye, Mishkinsky District, Republic of Bashkortostan, a selo in Novotroitsky Selsoviet of Mishkinsky District
Novotroitskaya, Republic of Bashkortostan, a village in Krivle-Ilyushkinsky Selsoviet of Kuyurgazinsky District

Bryansk Oblast
As of 2010, two rural localities in Bryansk Oblast bear this name:
Novotroitsky, Bryansk Oblast, a settlement in Aleshinsky Selsoviet of Navlinsky District
Novotroitskoye, Bryansk Oblast, a village in Novotroitsky Selsoviet of Kletnyansky District

Chelyabinsk Oblast
As of 2010, one rural locality in Chelyabinsk Oblast bears this name:
Novotroitsky, Chelyabinsk Oblast, a settlement in Poletayevsky Selsoviet of Sosnovsky District

Jewish Autonomous Oblast
As of 2010, one rural locality in the Jewish Autonomous Oblast bears this name:
Novotroitskoye, Jewish Autonomous Oblast, a selo in Leninsky District

Khabarovsk Krai
As of 2010, two rural localities in Khabarovsk Krai bear this name:
Novotroitskoye, Khabarovsky District, Khabarovsk Krai, a selo in Khabarovsky District
Novotroitskoye, Ulchsky District, Khabarovsk Krai, a selo in Ulchsky District

Republic of Khakassia
As of 2010, one rural locality in the Republic of Khakassia bears this name:
Novotroitskoye, Republic of Khakassia, a selo in Novotroitsky Selsoviet of Beysky District

Kirov Oblast
As of 2010, one rural locality in Kirov Oblast bears this name:
Novotroitskoye, Kirov Oblast, a selo in Novotroitsky Rural Okrug of Shabalinsky District

Krasnodar Krai
As of 2010, two rural localities in Krasnodar Krai bear this name:
Novotroitsky, Krymsky District, Krasnodar Krai, a khutor in Yuzhny Rural Okrug of Krymsky District
Novotroitsky, Mostovsky District, Krasnodar Krai, a khutor in Yaroslavsky Rural Okrug of Mostovsky District

Krasnoyarsk Krai
As of 2010, five rural localities in Krasnoyarsk Krai bear this name:
Novotroitskoye, Idrinsky District, Krasnoyarsk Krai, a selo in Novotroitsky Selsoviet of Idrinsky District
Novotroitskoye, Kazachinsky District, Krasnoyarsk Krai, a selo in Novotroitsky Selsoviet of Kazachinsky District
Novotroitskoye, Minusinsky District, Krasnoyarsk Krai, a selo in Novotroitsky Selsoviet of Minusinsky District
Novotroitskoye, Sukhobuzimsky District, Krasnoyarsk Krai, a selo in Shilinsky Selsoviet of Sukhobuzimsky District
Novotroitskaya, Krasnoyarsk Krai, a village in Ikshurminsky Selsoviet of Pirovsky District

Kurgan Oblast
As of 2010, two rural localities in Kurgan Oblast bear this name:
Novotroitskoye, Chastoozersky District, Kurgan Oblast, a selo in Novotroitsky Selsoviet of Chastoozersky District
Novotroitskoye, Mokrousovsky District, Kurgan Oblast, a village in Mikhaylovsky Selsoviet of Mokrousovsky District

Kursk Oblast
As of 2010, one rural locality in Kursk Oblast bears this name:
Novotroitskaya, Kursk Oblast, a village in Semenovsky Selsoviet of Kastorensky District

Lipetsk Oblast
As of 2010, two rural localities in Lipetsk Oblast bear this name:
Novotroitskoye, Dankovsky District, Lipetsk Oblast, a village in Berezovsky Selsoviet of Dankovsky District
Novotroitskoye, Dolgorukovsky District, Lipetsk Oblast, a selo in Veselovsky Selsoviet of Dolgorukovsky District

Mari El Republic
As of 2010, one rural locality in the Mari El Republic bears this name:
Novotroitskoye, Mari El Republic, a village in Alexeyevsky Rural Okrug of Sovetsky District

Republic of Mordovia
As of 2010, two rural localities in the Republic of Mordovia bear this name:
Novotroitsky, Republic of Mordovia, a settlement in Krasnomaysky Selsoviet of Kochkurovsky District
Novotroitskoye, Republic of Mordovia, a selo in Novotroitsky Selsoviet of Staroshaygovsky District

Moscow Oblast
As of 2010, one rural locality in Moscow Oblast bears this name:
Novotroitskoye, Moscow Oblast, a village in Fedinskoye Rural Settlement of Voskresensky District

Nizhny Novgorod Oblast
As of 2010, one rural locality in Nizhny Novgorod Oblast bears this name:
Novotroitskoye, Nizhny Novgorod Oblast, a village in Naruksovsky Selsoviet of Pochinkovsky District

Omsk Oblast
As of 2010, one rural locality in Omsk Oblast bears this name:
Novotroitskoye, Omsk Oblast, a selo in Novotroitsky Rural Okrug of Omsky District

Orenburg Oblast
As of 2010, one rural locality in Orenburg Oblast bears this name:
Novotroitskoye, Orenburg Oblast, a selo in Novotroitsky Selsoviet of Oktyabrsky District

Oryol Oblast
As of 2010, four rural localities in Oryol Oblast bear this name:
Novotroitsky, Kutafinsky Selsoviet, Kromskoy District, Oryol Oblast, a settlement in Kutafinsky Selsoviet of Kromskoy District
Novotroitsky, Shakhovsky Selsoviet, Kromskoy District, Oryol Oblast, a settlement in Shakhovsky Selsoviet of Kromskoy District
Novotroitskoye, Dolzhansky District, Oryol Oblast, a village in Kudinovsky Selsoviet of Dolzhansky District
Novotroitskoye, Orlovsky District, Oryol Oblast, a village in Pakhomovsky Selsoviet of Orlovsky District

Primorsky Krai
As of 2010, two rural localities in Primorsky Krai bear this name:
Novotroitskoye, Anuchinsky District, Primorsky Krai, a selo in Anuchinsky District
Novotroitskoye, Dalnerechensky District, Primorsky Krai, a selo in Dalnerechensky District

Pskov Oblast
As of 2010, one rural locality in Pskov Oblast bears this name:
Novotroitskoye, Pskov Oblast, a village in Kunyinsky District

Rostov Oblast
As of 2010, two rural localities in Rostov Oblast bear this name:
Novotroitsky, Rostov Oblast, a khutor in Boldyrevskoye Rural Settlement of Rodionovo-Nesvetaysky District
Novotroitskoye, Rostov Oblast, a selo in Zadonskoye Rural Settlement of Azovsky District

Sakhalin Oblast
As of 2010, one rural locality in Sakhalin Oblast bears this name:
Novotroitskoye, Sakhalin Oblast, a selo in Anivsky District

Stavropol Krai
As of 2010, one rural locality in Stavropol Krai bears this name:
Novotroitskaya, Stavropol Krai, a stanitsa in Izobilnensky District

Republic of Tatarstan
As of 2010, two rural localities in the Republic of Tatarstan bear this name:
Novotroitskoye, Almetyevsky District, Republic of Tatarstan, a selo in Almetyevsky District
Novotroitskoye, Tukayevsky District, Republic of Tatarstan, a selo in Tukayevsky District

Tula Oblast
As of 2010, one rural locality in Tula Oblast bears this name:
Novotroitskoye, Tula Oblast, a village in Andreyevskaya Volost of Kurkinsky District

Tver Oblast
As of 2010, two rural localities in Tver Oblast bear this name:
Novotroitskoye, Firovsky District, Tver Oblast, a village in Firovskoye Rural Settlement of Firovsky District
Novotroitskoye, Staritsky District, Tver Oblast, a village in Staritsa Rural Settlement of Staritsky District

Tyumen Oblast
As of 2010, two rural localities in Tyumen Oblast bear this name:
Novotroitskoye, Tyumen Oblast, a selo in Novotroitsky Rural Okrug of Nizhnetavdinsky District
Novotroitskaya, Tyumen Oblast, a village in Novoalexandrovsky Rural Okrug of Yarkovsky District

Udmurt Republic
As of 2010, three rural localities in the Udmurt Republic bear this name:
Novotroitsky, Alnashsky District, Udmurt Republic, a village in Tekhnikumovsky Selsoviet of Alnashsky District
Novotroitsky, Vavozhsky District, Udmurt Republic, a village in Tylovyl-Pelginsky Selsoviet of Vavozhsky District
Novotroitskoye, Udmurt Republic, a village in Vasilyevsky Selsoviet of Kiznersky District

Ulyanovsk Oblast
As of 2010, one rural locality in Ulyanovsk Oblast bears this name:
Novotroitskaya, Ulyanovsk Oblast, a settlement in Annenkovsky Rural Okrug of Maynsky District

Voronezh Oblast
As of 2010, three rural localities in Voronezh Oblast bear this name:
Novotroitsky, Voronezh Oblast, a settlement in Alexandrovskoye Rural Settlement of Talovsky District
Novotroitskoye, Petropavlovsky District, Voronezh Oblast, a selo in Novotroitskoye Rural Settlement of Petropavlovsky District
Novotroitskoye, Ternovsky District, Voronezh Oblast, a selo in Novotroitskoye Rural Settlement of Ternovsky District

Yaroslavl Oblast
As of 2010, two rural localities in Yaroslavl Oblast bear this name:
Novotroitskoye, Rostovsky District, Yaroslavl Oblast, a selo in Fatyanovsky Rural Okrug of Rostovsky District
Novotroitskoye, Tutayevsky District, Yaroslavl Oblast, a village in Pomogalovsky Rural Okrug of Tutayevsky District

See also
Novotroitsk
Troitsky (disambiguation)
Troitsk